Barycholos, common name Chimbo frogs, is a genus of small frogs in the family Strabomantidae found in south-eastern Brazil and tropical lowland Ecuador. The name Barycholos, from the Greek  ("savage"), is in honor of herpetologist Jay M. Savage.

Species
There are two species:
 Barycholos pulcher (Boulenger, 1898)
 Barycholos ternetzi (Miranda-Ribeiro, 1937)

References

 
Strabomantidae
Amphibians of South America
Amphibian genera